Something for You: Eliane Elias Sings & Plays Bill Evans is the eighteenth studio album by Brazilian jazz artist Eliane Elias. It was released on 15 January 2008 via Blue Note label.

Background
This is one of Elias' most critically acclaimed albums, with both Allmusic and All About Jazz giving it 4½ stars out of five. The album includes two Bill Evans compositions recently discovered by her husband, bassist Marc Johnson, on a cassette that Evans gave him shortly before he died: "Evanesque" and "Here Is Something for You". Elias actually recreated "Evanesque" from the elements of Evans' original composition. Elias also wrote lyrics to the song "Here Is Something for You", incorporating allusions to other tunes and pieces associated with Evans. She performs vocal parts on six of the seventeen cuts.

Reception
Doug Ramsey of Jazz Times wrote "Like so many jazz pianists of her generation, Eliane Elias formed her musical sensibility under the spell of Bill Evans. In this collection, she makes plain the extent and depth of his influence as well as her own expressive growth in the three decades since she first heard Evans. She demonstrates both aspects in a reduction of "I Love My Wife." Less than half as long as Evans' 1978 recording, the Elias performance does not reach his rhythmic intensity. But she finds the song's emotional core and manages to approximate on one piano much of the harmonic density and complexity of line that Evans achieved by overdubbing three piano tracks." The Buffalo News review by Jeff Simon noted, "There's certainly a lot of charm to her singing here, as well as her playing."

Ken Dryden of Allmusic noted "Eliane Elias' return to the Blue Note label after a decade working elsewhere is a triumph. This salute to the late pianist Bill Evans, one of her favorite players, explores a number of songs he recorded, including both standards and originals. Evans' bassist from his final trio, Marc Johnson, is not only a long-time collaborator with Elias but also her husband; drummer Joey Baron rounds out the band. While Elias is influenced by Evans' playing style, his arrangements are only a launching pad for her approach to each tune; never does she sound like an obvious Evans clone."

Track listing

Credits
Band
Eliane Elias – piano, vocals, producer
Marc Johnson – bass, co-producer
Joey Baron – drums
Bill Evans – piano (track 17)

Production
Kaoru Taku – art direction
Steve Rodby – co-producer
Ken Arai – coordinator
Hitoshi Namekata – executive producer
Don Heckman – liner notes
Mark Wilder – mastering 
Al Schmidt – recording

Chart positions

References

External links

2008 albums
Eliane Elias albums
Blue Note Records albums